Precious Moments is the eleventh studio album, and second on Arista Records, from Jermaine Jackson.  Released in 1986, the album includes the pop and R&B top-20 hit, "I Think It's Love" (co-written with Stevie Wonder) along with the Top 40 US R&B hit "Do You Remember Me?", and Top 40 Belgian hits "Lonely Won't Leave Me Alone" and "Words Into Action".

The album track "If You Say My Eyes Are Beautiful," a duet with Whitney Houston was never released as a single, however, the ballad received significant radio airplay at the time and can still be heard occasionally on certain soft rock/quiet storm-formatted radio stations today and was included on Houston's 2000 compilation Whitney: The Greatest Hits.

"Words Into Action" was featured in the 1986 film About Last Night and was included on the film soundtrack.

Track listing
"Do You Remember Me?" (Jermaine Jackson, Michael Omartian, Bruce Sudano) - 5:03
"Lonely Won't Leave Me Alone" (Jackson, Tom Keane, Kathy Wakefield, David Foster) - 4:30
"Give a Little Love" (David Malloy, Rodney Crowell) - 3:53
"Precious Moments" (Jackson, Keane) - 5:10
"I Think It's Love" (Jackson, Omartian, Stevie Wonder) - 3:52
"Our Love Story" (Jackson, Keane, David Batteau) - 4:31
"I Hear Heartbeat" (Mick Leeson, Peter Vale) - 5:39
"If You Say My Eyes Are Beautiful" (Duet with Whitney Houston) (Elliot Willensky) - 4:19
"Voices in the Dark" (Jackson, Omartian) - 4:36
"Words into Action" (Leeson, Vale) - 4:55

2012 Remaster (Expanded Edition)
Do You Remember Me?
Lonely Won't Leave Me Alone
Give A Little Love
Precious Moments
I Think It's Love
Our Love Story
I Hear Heartbeat
If You Say My Eyes Are Beautiful - (Duet with Whitney Houston)
Voices In The Dark
Words Into Action
Closest Thing To Perfect {Extended Version}
I Think It's Love {Extended Remix}
Do You Remember Me? {Michael Omartian Remix}
Do You Remember Me? {Jellybean Remix}
Do You Remember Me? {Bruce Forest Remix}
B-side
 Whatcha Doin' (single "Do You Remember Me?")

Personnel
 Jermaine Jackson – lead and backing vocals
 Michael Omartian – keyboards (1, 3, 5, 9, 10), synthesizers (1, 3, 5, 9, 10), DX7 bass (1, 9, 10), Moog Source bass (1, 3, 5), drum programming (1, 3, 5, 9, 10), arrangements (1, 3, 5, 9, 10), horn arrangements (5)
 Marcus Ryle – synthesizer programming (1, 3, 5, 9)
 Tom Keane – keyboards (2, 4, 6, 8), synthesizers (2, 4, 6, 8), Moog bass (2, 4, 6, 8), arrangements (2, 4, 6), drum programming (4, 6), backing vocals (4, 6, 7)
 Bo Tomlyn – keyboards (2, 6, 8), synthesizers (2, 6, 8)
 Dean Gant – keyboards (7), synthesizers (7), DX7 bass (7), drum programming (7)
 Michael Landau – guitar (1-6, 8, 9)
 Paul Jackson, Jr. – guitar (7)
 Steve Lukather – guitar (8)
 Dann Huff – guitar (10)
 John Robinson – drums (2), hi-hat (3), cymbal (3)
 John Keane – drums (8)
 Paulinho da Costa – percussion (1, 4, 5, 6, 8, 9)
 Gary Herbig – saxophone (1, 3, 5, 9)
 Kim Hutchcroft – saxophone (1, 5, 9)
 Marc Russo – saxophone (4)
 Ernie Watts – saxophone (10)
 Chuck Findley – trombone (1, 5, 9)
 Gary Grant – trumpet (1, 5, 9)
 Jerry Hey – trumpet (1, 5, 9), horn arrangements (5)
 Jeremy Lubbock – string arrangements (2)
 Vesta Williams – backing vocals (1)
 Portia Griffin – backing vocals (2, 5)
 Julia Waters – backing vocals (2, 6)
 Maxine Waters – backing vocals (2, 6)
 Mona Lisa Young – backing vocals (5)
 Whitney Houston – lead vocals (8)

Production
 Producers – Michael Omartian (Tracks 1, 3, 5, 9 & 10); Jermaine Jackson and Tom Keane (Tracks 2, 4, 6, 7 & 8).
 Executive Producer – Clive Davis
 Engineers – Terry Christian (Tracks 1, 3, 5, 9 & 10); Steve Hodge (Tracks 2, 4, 6, 7 & 8).
 Whitney Houston's vocal on Track 8 recorded by Michael Hutchinson.
 Mixing – John Guess (Tracks 1, 3, 9 & 10); Steve Hodge (Tracks 2, 4, 6, 7 & 8); Humberto Gatica (Tracks 3 & 5)
 Remixing on Tracks 2 & 6 – Humberto Gatica
 Art Direction – Ria Lewerke
 Artwork – Paul Jasmin

Charts

References

1986 albums
Jermaine Jackson albums
Albums produced by Michael Omartian
Arista Records albums